The Republic of the Congo is a country located in Central Africa. It is bordered by Gabon, Cameroon, the Central African Republic, the Democratic Republic of the Congo and the Angolan exclave of Cabinda. In the early 1980s, rapidly rising oil revenues enabled the government to finance large-scale development projects with GDP growth averaging 5% annually, one of the highest rates in Africa. The government has mortgaged a substantial portion of its petroleum earnings, contributing to a shortage of revenues. The January 12, 1994 devaluation of Franc Zone currencies by 50% resulted in inflation of 46% in 1994, but inflation has subsided since.

Notable firms 
This list includes notable companies with primary headquarters located in the country. The industry and sector follow the Industry Classification Benchmark taxonomy. Organizations which have ceased operations are included and noted as defunct.

See also 
 List of airlines of the Republic of the Congo
 List of banks in the Republic of the Congo
 List of supermarket chains in the Republic of the Congo

References 

Companies of the Republic of the Congo
Economy of the Republic of the Congo
 
Congo, Republic Of The